Interklinik Bratislava is a clinic based in the capital of the Slovak Republic, Bratislava. Established in 1995, it consists of over 1,000 square meters of operating rooms, ambulances, inpatient rooms and spa.

Default

Interklinik consists of a number of interconnected companies, several ones of which are in default- their net equity is negative. 
The Interklinik companies in default as of June 2018 are:
INTERKLINIK SPA s.r.o.  and 
INTERKLINIK VITAL s.r.o. 

As of June 2018, there are creditors publicly seeking other creditors for the purposes of joint action/acquisition of debt.

History
Interklinik was established in 1994 as a clinic specialising in several areas of surgery. Under the auspices of its new director Tomas Stern, M.D. it later moved to the city-center of Bratislava and increased its scope of specialisations, including stomatology and medical spa treatments. The company offering spa treatments- Interklinik SPA s.r.o., is currently in default.

Mr. Tomas Stern is currently the sole director of INTERKLINIK VITAL s.r.o. and one o the directors of INTERKLINIK SPA s.r.o. 

Today the clinic is situated at Einsteinova street in the Petržalka district.

References

External links
 Official website

Medical and health organisations based in Slovakia